Bonny Island is situated at the southern edge of Rivers State in the Niger Delta region of Nigeria. It is near Port Harcourt. Ferries are the main form of transport to and from the island. The local language spoken on Bonny Island is Ibani, which is an Ijaw dialect. Many natives also speak the Igbo language.

History
Located at the edge of the Atlantic Ocean on the Bight of Bonny, the island of Bonny serves as the seat of a traditional state known as the Kingdom of Bonny.

Bonny was founded by a priest king known as Ndoli. He (as well as his successors Opuamakuba and Alagbariye) were the leaders of the founding group of Bonny Island. The virgin lands and territories of the island kingdom were settled about or before 1000AD. Asimini, the fourth king (but the first one to be crowned), founded a dynasty that went on to provide most of the kingdom's monarchs.

Founding myth
It is believed today that the founders of the island kingdom were originally from within the Isedani lineage of Kolokuma in the Ebeni-toru region  (in the present day Kolokuma/Opokuma Local Government Area of Bayelsa State). They were led to the new site by four direct descendants of Ebeni. These were Ndoli, Opuamakuba, Alagbariye and Asimini. Upon their arrival in Bonny, the four ruled the new settlement that they established there in turn. From these leaders and the entire founding generation of the kingdom evolved the lineage/ward/house system of governance that the kingdom is currently organized into.

Structure of the kingdom 
The king, or monarch (lit. owner of the land), is provided by the Pepple dynasty and presides over a chieftaincy system composed of "Ase-Alapu" (or high chiefs of royal blood) and "Amadapu" (or district heads). All of the former serve as members of the Bonny Chiefs' Council, the amanyanabo's privy council.

Bonny Island has thirty-four sub-sectional units (known as Houses). All represent the progeny of the founding generation of its kingdom. A few prominent houses are:

(i) The Fubara Manilla Pepple House,

(ii) The Wilcox House,

(iii) The Jumbo House, and

(iv) The Awusa Halliday House.

The different houses are known for having individual ancestral headquarters. The early descendants of the Kongo lineage, for example, established Ikpapkayo (or, as it's known today, Finima).

Notable events
Bonny Island was a hotbed of economic activity right from the 15th century.  The Portuguese arrived at this time, and the island kingdom subsequently established good relations with them. It sent its first ambassador, Prince Abagy, to Portugal in about 1450AD.

In the 19th Century AD, Bonny Island accepted Christianity through the ministry of Bishop Samuel Ajayi Crowther. Prior to this event, the totem of the kingdom had been the iguana.

It was also in that century that a civil war was fought between those loyal to Chief Oko Jumbo of the Manilla Pepple house and those loyal to Chief Jaja of the Anne Pepple house. This war eventually led to the establishment of the Kingdom of Opobo.

Bonny today
With a thriving traditional system and robust cultural heritage, Bonny stands out as one of Nigeria's most vibrant communities. Her traditional institution is headed by King Edward William Asimini Dappa Pepple III, Perekule XI, who serves as amanyanabo and natural ruler. The Chiefs' Council is led by Chief Reginald Abbey-Hart, who is the high chief and head of Captain Hart house. Each high chief independently rules his house because the chiefs' council is traditionally seen as a commonwealth of independent nations that came together for the sole purpose of protecting the kingdom as a whole.

The community is subdivided into two main segments – the mainland and the hinterland. The mainland comprises Bonny Island and its segments, namely the Main Island (Township), Sandfield, Iwoama, Orosikiri, Aganya, Ayambo, Akiama, New Road, wilbross pipeline, Workers Camp, and some outlying fishing settlements lying along the Bonny River’s coastline. The hinterland includes the village communities such as Kuruma, Ayama, Kalaibiama and Oloma.

Presently, the Kingdom of Bonny has thirty five chieftaincy houses. These are fourteen major chieftaincy houses (five among which are Duawaris); twenty minor chieftaincy houses; and then the George Pepple lineage of the Perekule royal house that has recently been producing kings of the kingdom. The ancestry of the Perekule royal house may be traced to the Duawaris themselves.

It was the founding generation of Bonny that established the kingdom's civilisation and commonwealth. All the chieftaincy houses, and the people that belong to them, derive their authority in Bonny from their descent from its founders.

Economy
In the early 1990s the Federal Government of Nigeria, in collaboration with 3 international partners, Shell Gas BV., CLEAG Limited [ELF] and AGIP International BV. started the multibillion-dollar project Nigeria Liquefied Natural Gas Limited (Nigeria LNG). Due to its strategic position, Bonny Island, particularly the Finima community area along Bonny Island, is hosting various multinational oil companies including Royal Dutch Shell, Mobil, Chevron, Agip, and TotalEnergies.

Education
Public and private secondary schools on the island include:
 Bonny National Grammar School
 Spring Foundation Group of Schools
 Favourite International Academy 
 St.Paul's Comprehensive College
 Government Girls Secondary School
 Community Secondary School 
 Lucille Education Centre
 Kingdom Heritage
 King and Queen school
 RA International School
Logos International School

Institution:
 Federal Polytechnic of Oil and Gas, Bonny

Tourist attractions
Bonny Island is surrounded on the west and south by long stretches of beaches. The beautiful beaches attract tourists and fun seeking inhabitants alike on sunny days and festive periods like Christmas and Easter. On 26 and 31 December of every year, thousands of people visit the Finima beaches for beach carnivals. There is also the Finima Nature Park, which is an important tourist area located at the right-hand side of the roundabout.

References

External links

 Historians.org

Islands of Nigeria
Islands of Rivers State
Geography of Port Harcourt